Dato' Dr. Wong Sai Hou is a former state assemblyman for Kampung Tunku, Malaysia. He is also state vice-chairman and a veteran member of Malaysian Chinese Association (MCA) (34 years). His wife, Datin Jennifer Wong (Goh Beng Lan) is the former Principal of SMK La Salle Brickfields. His house was attacked and burned with a gasoline bomb in 2005 but was put out by his wife, Datin Jennifer Wong.

Election results

Honours 
  :
  Knight Commander of the Order of the Crown of Selangor (DPMS) - Dato' (2003)

References

Malaysian politicians of Chinese descent
Living people
Malaysian Chinese Association politicians
Members of the Selangor State Legislative Assembly
Year of birth missing (living people)
Knights Commander of the Order of the Crown of Selangor